Thomas St Poll (c. 1539 – 1582) was the member of Parliament for Great Grimsby in 1571 and Lincolnshire in 1572.

References 

English justices of the peace
1530s births
1582 deaths
Year of birth uncertain
Members of the Parliament of England for Great Grimsby
English MPs 1571
English MPs 1572–1583